Department of Education, abbreviated as DoE, is the executive department of the Ministry of Education, Nepal government responsible for the management and upkeep of the Nepalese system of education. It is the main implementation agency of Nepali educational plan and policy and is responsible for the basic and secondary education system in Nepal.

History
DoE was established on 23 May 1999.

References 

Government departments of Nepal
1999 establishments in Nepal